Zebra Man may refer to:

Zebraman, a 2004 film by Takashi Miike
Zebraman 2: Attack on Zebra City, a 2010 sequel film
Zebra-Man, the name of several villains in DC Comics
The Zebra Man, stage name of sideshow performer Horace Ridler (1892–1969)

See also
 Zebra (disambiguation)